Eugene J. "Gabbie" Milliner (November 27, 1878 – January 15, 1921) was a Negro leagues outfielder for several years before the founding of the first Negro National League.

Milliner died at the age of 42 in Denver, Colorado.

References

External links
  and Seamheads

Brooklyn Royal Giants players
1878 births
1921 deaths
Hot Springs Arlingtons players
St. Paul Colored Gophers players
20th-century African-American people
Kansas City Giants players
Kansas City Royal Giants players